CITA-FM is a Canadian radio station, broadcasting a Christian programming format at 105.1 FM in Moncton, New Brunswick.

The station is co-owned with CJLU-FM in Dartmouth, Nova Scotia.

On August 24, 2000, the International Harvesters for Christ Evangelistic Association Inc. received approval from the CRTC to operate on the frequency 105.9 MHz.

On August 22, 2007, the CRTC approved an application for CITA to move from 105.9 FM to 105.1 FM, and to increase its signal strength to 880 watts. This change was prompted by the Canadian Broadcasting Corporation's decision to move CBA from the AM band to 106.1 on the FM band, now known as CBAM-FM.

On June 30, 2017, the CRTC denied an application by International Harvesters for Christ Evangelistic Association Inc. to operate an English-language commercial FM specialty (Christian music) radio station at 104.9 MHz in Saint John, New Brunswick.

Rebroadcasters
CITA has a number of rebroadcasters that serve communities in New Brunswick and Nova Scotia.

CITA-FM-1 107.3 FM - Sussex, New Brunswick
CITA-FM-2 99.1 FM - Amherst, Nova Scotia
CITA-FM-4 107.7 FM - Bouctouche, New Brunswick

References

External links
 CITA Radio
 

Ita
Ita
Radio stations established in 2000
2000 establishments in New Brunswick